R (Corner House Research) v Director of the Serious Fraud Office [2008] UKHL 60 is a UK constitutional law case, concerning the rule of law.

Facts
Corner House Research is a non-governmental organization involved in the Campaign Against Arms Trade coalition. The Corner House applied for judicial review of the Serious Fraud Office (SFO) decision to stop investigating BAE Systems. The SFO director decided to halt a criminal investigation into alleged bribery in relation to an arms supply contract between BAE Systems and the Saudi Arabian authorities, known as the Al-Yamamah arms deal. The UK government gave arms in return for 600,000 barrels (95,000 cubic metres) of crude oil per day. The first sales were in September 1985, and more recently 72 Eurofighter Typhoons in August 2006. In August 2005 CEO Mike Turner said BAE earned £43bn and could earn £40bn more. In 2010, BAE pleaded guilty to charges in the US of false accounting and making misleading statements. The Serious Fraud Office began to investigate. Saudi Arabia had threatened to take action that would damage UK security if the investigation continued. The SFO dropped the investigation.

Judgment

Divisional Court
Moses LJ and Sullivan J held the Director of the Serious Fraud Office violated the rule of law by dropping investigation into bribery charges against BAE Systems. In his judgment he said the following.

House of Lords
The House of Lords held the possible consequences that might flow from pursuing the investigation were considered to be sufficiently serious to persuade the House that the Director’s decision was lawful. Lord Bingham said the following.

Lord Hoffmann and Lord Rodger agreed.

Baroness Hale said the following.

Lord Brown gave a concurring opinion.

See also

United Kingdom constitutional law

Notes

References
J Jowell [2008] JR 273 
Lord Steyn [2009] PL 338

United Kingdom constitutional case law